Jyrki Seppä (born 14 November 1961 in Tampere, Finland) is a retired professional ice hockey player in the National Hockey League.

Playing career

Pre-NHL career
Jyrki Seppä started his active career in 1979, when he played for Tampere Ilves in SM-liiga.

Seppä played two seasons for Ilves before he moved to Jokerit of Helsinki. Seppä played 1981–82 season for Jokerit before he was contracted by Winnipeg Jets

NHL career
Jyrki Seppä was drafted by the Winnipeg Jets in the 1981 NHL Entry Draft in the third round, 43rd overall. He played one season in the NHL for Winnipeg in 1983–84 and two seasons in the American Hockey League for the Sherbrooke Jets. During that NHL season, he played in 13 games picking up two assists and six penalty minutes.

After NHL
After his short NHL-visit, Seppä retired from active playing when he was 24 years of age. Seppä however returned and played again for Jokerit in SM-liiga. Seppä retired soon after his return season to Jokerit in 1986. The reason behind his early retirement was injuries and the lack of desire to play.

Career statistics

Regular season and playoffs

International

External links
 

1961 births
Living people
Finnish ice hockey defencemen
HPK players
Ice hockey people from Tampere
Ilves players
Jokerit players
Sherbrooke Jets players
Winnipeg Jets (1979–1996) draft picks
Winnipeg Jets (1979–1996) players